Squamous-cell carcinoma of the vagina is a potentially invasive type of cancer that forms in the tissues of the vagina.  Though uncommon, squamous-cell cancer of the vagina (SCCV) is the most common type of vaginal cancer. It is further subdivided into the following subtypes: keratinizing, nonkeratinizing, basaloid, and warty. It forms in squamous cells, the thin, flat cells lining the vagina. Squamous cell vaginal cancer spreads slowly and usually stays near the vagina, but may spread to the lungs, liver, or bone. This is the most common type of vaginal cancer. SCCV accounts for approximately 85% of vaginal cancer cases and initially spreads superficially within the vaginal wall. It can later invade other vaginal tissues. The carcinoma can metastasize to the lungs, and less frequently in liver, bone, or other sites. SCC of the vagina is associated with a high rate of infection with oncogenic strains of human papillomavirus (HPV) and has many risk factors in common with cervical cancer.

Signs and symptoms 
SCCV may not cause early signs or symptoms and may be found during a routine pelvic exam and Pap test. Signs and symptoms may be caused by other types of vaginal cancer or by other conditions:
 bleeding or discharge not related to menstrual period
 pain during sexual intercourse
 pain in the pelvic area
 lump in the vagina
 pain when urinating
 constipation

Risks
 multiple sex partners
 age > 60 years
 smoking
 human papillomavirus (HPV) infection
 early age at first intercourse

Diagnosis 
Diagnosis includes a complete assessment of medical history and physical examination. A pelvic exam is typically performed. Other diagnostic procedures used are the pap test, colposcopy and biopsy. Other procedures are used to aid in diagnosis: chest x-ray, CT scan (CAT scan), MRI (magnetic resonance imaging), PET scan (positron emission tomography scan), and cystoscopy.

Treatment 
Treatment depends upon the following:
 stage and size of the cancer
 Whether the cancer is close to other organs that may be damaged by treatment
 Whether the patient has a uterus or has had a hysterectomy
 Whether the patient has had past radiation treatment to the pelvis

Epidemiology
Those most affected are:
older women
peak incidence 60-79 years
< 15% in women < 50 years old
< 10% in women < 40 years old
Fifty percent of SCCV associated with hysterectomy
Incidence may increase with pelvic organ prolapse
 More prevalent in black and Hispanic women
accounts for 80%-90% of all vaginal cancers

References

External links 

 Clearinghouse of Information for DES daughters and Sons
 National Cancer Institute: Vaginal Cancer
 Clinically reviewed vaginal cancer information for patients
 UK vaginal cancer statistics
 Cancer.Net: Vaginal Cancer

Gynaecological cancer
Papillomavirus-associated diseases
Vagina
Women's health
Oncology